Lincoln is a census-designated place in Bonneville County, Idaho located just east of Idaho Falls, southwest of Iona and north of Ammon. As of the 2010 census, its population was 3,647.

Lincoln as a separate place came into being when a school house was built there in 1899 by residents who felt it was too far to send their children to school in Iona.  It was originally named Centerville.  In 1903 the Utah Sugar Company bought a piece of land here and built a factory.  The builder of the factory was Heber C. Austin who also built many houses for factory workers and planted many trees.  In 1904 a Latter-day Saint branch was organized in Lincoln as part of the Iona Ward.  In 1905 the branch was made a separate ward with Austin as the bishop.

In 1930 the population of Lincoln was 500, 83% of whom were Latter-day Saints.  In 2000 the population of Lincoln was around 500 as well, however by 2010 urban expansion in the Idaho Falls metropolitan area increased the population.

Education
It is in the Bonneville Joint School District.

Demographics

References

Andrew Jenson. Encyclopedic History of the Church. (Salt Lake City: Deseret News Press, 1941). p. 434.
2009 Rand McNally Road Atlas. p. 130.

Populated places established in 1899
Census-designated places in Bonneville County, Idaho
Census-designated places in Idaho